The 2013 South American Footballer of the Year, given to the best football player in South America by Uruguayan newspaper El País through voting by journalists across the continent, was awarded to Ronaldinho of Atlético Mineiro on December 31, 2013.

Rankings

1Players who have been to Europe before ending the season.

References
General

Specific

External links

2013
Footballer Of The Year